Mizeria is a salad which originated in Poland and consists of thinly sliced or grated cucumbers, often with sweet sour cream or kefir, though in some cases oil. Other possible ingredients include onions, pepper or lemon juice, sugar, dill, chives, mint or parsley. The dish is usually served alongside a main course and is one of the most popular salads in Poland. 

Mizeria is also customarily made in the Hungarian-American community in Toledo, Ohio.

See also
 List of salads
 Polish cuisine
 Tzatziki

References

Polish cuisine
Salads